Ayumi Hamasaki Countdown Live 2009–2010 A: Future Classics is Japanese pop singer Ayumi Hamasaki's 9th Countdown concert DVD.

Track list
 I am...
 Moments
 Step you
 Energize
 About You
 momentum
 You were...
 Pride
 Inspire
 Because of You
 1 Love
 until that Day...
 Humming 7/4
 evolution
 Startin'

Encore
 Teddy Bear
 Sunrise ~Love Is All~
 Boys & Girls
 Red Line ~for TA~

Total reported sales
56,544

Oricon week ranks
1st Week: #2

References

Ayumi Hamasaki video albums
Live video albums